João Moreira Salles (Rio de Janeiro, born 1962) is a Brazilian documentarian and president of the Instituto Moreira Salles.  In 2006, he founded the magazine piauí.  He has also taught courses on documentary at the Pontifical Catholic University of Rio de Janeiro and Princeton University.

Filmography 
 1989 - América (TV series)
 1990 - Blues (TV series)
 1998 - Futebol (TV series directed with Arthur Fontes)
 1999 - News From a Personal War (directed and written with Kátia Lund)
 2003 - Nelson Freire
 2004 - Entreatos
 2006 - Santiago
 2017 - No Intenso Agora

Awards and nominations 
 2000 - Silver Daisy Awards, Brazil (Silver Daisy for Notícias de uma Guerra Particular)
 2001 - Málaga Spanish Film Festival (Special Mention for Notícias de uma Guerra Particular, shared with Kátia Lund)
 2003 - Silver Daisy Awards, Brazil (Silver Daisy for Nelson Freire)
 2004 - São Paulo Association of Art Critics Awards (Best Documentary for Nelson Freire)
 2004 - Cinema Brazil Grand Prize (Best Documentary for Nelson Freire)
 2005 - São Paulo Association of Art Critics Awards (Best Film for Entreatos)
 2005 - Havana Film Festival (Grand Coral - Second Prize for Entreatos)
 2007 - Lima Latin American Film Festival (Best Documentary for Santiago)
 2007 - Cinéma du réel (Grand Prize for "Santiago")
 2007 - Alba International Film Festival (Audience Award for "Santiago")
 2008 - Miami International Film Festival (Knight Grand Jury Prize for "Santiago")

Contributions to cinema
 2001 - A Beautiful Mind (Location Scout)
 2003 - Dorm Daze (Script Doctor (uncredited))
 2006 - Dorm Daze 2 (Substance Consultant)

Journalism 
 2010 - Prêmio Esso de Informação Científica, Tecnológica e Ecológica for Artur tem um problema
 2011 - Frist Golden Campus Casserole Award – Best Gastronomy Critic, category university cafeterias

References

External links 
 

Living people
Brazilian film directors
Brazilian billionaires
Academic staff of the Pontifical Catholic University of Rio de Janeiro
Salles family
Year of birth missing (living people)